The Pennsylvania General Assembly, the legislature of the U.S. state of Pennsylvania, has convened many times since statehood became effective on December 12, 1787. In earlier colonial times (1682–1776) the legislature was known as the Pennsylvania Provincial Assembly.

Legislatures

 12th Pennsylvania General Assembly, 1787–1788
 24th Pennsylvania General Assembly, 1799–1800
 2005. See also: 2005 Pennsylvania General Assembly pay raise controversy.
 2006. See also: 2006 Pennsylvania General Assembly bonus controversy.
 2010:  January 5 – November 30, 2010
 2011: January 4 – November 30, 2011
 2012: January 3 – November 30, 2012; House Resolution 535 passed on January 24, 2012.
 2013: January 2 – December 31, 2013
 2014: January 7 – November 12, 2014
 2015: January 6 – December 31, 2015
 2016: January 5 – November 30, 2016
 2017:  January 3 – December 31, 2017 
 2018: January 2 – November 30, 2018
 2019:  January 1 – December 31, 2019

See also
 List of speakers of the Pennsylvania House of Representatives
 List of governors of Pennsylvania
 History of Pennsylvania

References

External links
 Pennsylvania General Assembly. Session Information
  (library guide)
 

Legislatures
Legislature
 
Pennsylvania
pennsylvania